Miss Arizona is a competition to select the representative for the state of Arizona in the Miss America pageant.

Miss Arizona may also refer to:

Pageant competitions
 Miss Arizona USA, a competition to select the representative for the state of Arizona in the Miss USA pageant
 Miss Arizona World, a competition to select the representative for the state of Arizona in the Miss World America pageant
 Miss Arizona Teen USA, a competition to select the representative for the state of Arizona in the Miss Teen USA pageant
 Miss Arizona's Outstanding Teen, a competition to select the representative for the state of Arizona in the Miss America's Teen pageant

Films
 Miss Arizona (1919 film), a western silent film
 Miss Arizona (1988 film), a Hungarian drama film
 Miss Arizona (2018 film), an American comedy film starring Johanna Braddy